The 1970 Georges River state by-election was held on 19 September 1970 for the New South Wales Legislative Assembly seat of Georges River. It was triggered by the death of Douglas Cross.

Dates

Result 

Douglas Cross died.

See also
Electoral results for the district of Georges River
List of New South Wales state by-elections

References 

1970 elections in Australia
New South Wales state by-elections
1970s in New South Wales
February 1970 events in Australia